Esther Perel (born 1958) is a Belgian-American psychotherapist, known for her work on human relationships.

Perel promoted the concept of "erotic intelligence" in her book Mating in Captivity: Unlocking Erotic Intelligence (2006), which has been translated into 24 languages. After publishing the book, she became an international advisor on sex and relationships. She has given two TED talks, hosts two podcasts, runs a series of therapy training / supervision events, and launched a card game.

In 2016, Perel was added to Oprah Winfrey's Supersoul 100 list of visionaries and influential leaders.

Early life and education
Perel, the daughter of two Polish-born, Jewish, Holocaust survivors, was raised in Antwerp, Belgium, and attended the Hebrew University of Jerusalem in Israel, where she earned a B.A. in educational psychology and French literature, and subsequently earned a master's degree in expressive art therapy from Lesley University in Cambridge, Massachusetts.

Perel grew up amongst Holocaust survivors in Antwerp, later categorising them into two groups: "those who didn't die, and those who came back to life". She asserts that "those who came back to life were those who understood eroticism as an antidote to death."

Career
Perel subsequently trained in psychodynamic psychotherapy before finding a professional home in family systems theory. She initially worked as a cross-cultural psychotherapist with couples and families. For 13 years she was a clinical instructor at the New York University School of Medicine.

Perel has also worked as an actress (appearing in the 2017 film, Newness, as herself) and run a clothing boutique in Antwerp.

Personal life
Perel is Jewish and is married to Jack Saul, Assistant Professor of Clinical Population and Family Health at Columbia University Mailman School of Public Health, with whom she has two sons, Adam and Noam. She is fluent in nine languages: English, French, German, Hebrew, Italian, Portuguese, Spanish, Dutch, and Yiddish.

Ideas 
Perel argues that, due to trends such as the secularization of Western society, the rise of individualism, and the societal "mandate" for personal happiness, the expectations for romantic relationships are higher than ever:Never before have our expectations of marriage taken on such epic proportions. We still want everything the traditional family was meant to provide—security, children, property, and respectability—but now we also want our partner to love us, to desire us, to be interested in us. We should be best friends, trusted confidants, and passionate lovers to boot.She also notes the ideals of modern marriage are often contradictory: "We want our chosen one to offer stability, safety, predictability, and dependability—all the anchoring experiences. And we want that very same person to supply awe, mystery, adventure, and risk." Perel calls for a more open and honest discussion of monogamy to reconcile this conflict between the erotic and the domestic.

Podcasts
Perel is the host of two podcasts: Where Should We Begin? and How's Work?

 Where Should We Begin? brings the listeners inside Perel's therapist's office as she sees anonymous couples in search of insight on everything from infidelity to sexlessness to grief. The unique format combines live recordings of the therapy session, with Perel's reflections on what she heard, and what techniques she tried. The New York Times writes: "it feels more like an unraveling mystery story than a relationship advice show." The couples include both heterosexual and same-sex couples. The first episode aired on Audible in May 2017, and became publicly available on iTunes on October 9, 2017. Three seasons have been released . Where Should We Begin? received a 2018 Gracie Award.
 How's Work? is Perel's second podcast. It follows a format similar to the couples therapy session in Where Should We Begin? — but this time the couple seeking Perel's advice are cofounders or colleagues, navigating the challenges that play out in work relationships. HuffPost describes each episode as a "one-time therapy session between Perel and various co-founders, members of family businesses and partners with a thriving operation but deteriorating relations on the job." As described in one review: "The podcast aims to shine light on the things that form us as individuals and how those things relate to life in the workplace. Because, honestly, a lot of people hold their careers and workplace relationships as dearly and tightly as they do their romantic relationships." How's Work? was created by Gimlet Media, and was available exclusively on Spotify. The show first aired in November 2019. In March 2023, Bloomberg announced that How's Work? was acquired by Vox Media's Podcast Network.

Publications
Mating in Captivity: Unlocking Erotic Intelligence (2006, Harper)
The State of Affairs: Rethinking Infidelity (2017, Harper)

Recognition
 2016: Named to Oprah Winfrey's Supersoul 100 list of visionaries and influential leaders.
 Perel was selected for the inaugural 2021 Forbes 50 Over 50; made up of entrepreneurs, leaders, scientists and creators who are over the age of 50.

References

Sources
 In search of Erotic Intelligence: Reconciling our desire for comfortable domesticity and hot sex
 Sexual Genius: An Interview With Esther Perel
 Esther Perel on Mating in Captivity

External links
 
 
 
 "The secret to desire in a long-term relationship" (TEDSalon NY2013)
 "Rethinking infidelity ... a talk for anyone who has ever loved" (TED 2015)
 Articles by Esther Perel at Huffington Post

1958 births
Living people
Belgian psychologists
Belgian women psychologists
Belgian Jews
Hebrew University of Jerusalem alumni